Le Grand Chef is a 2007 South Korean film starring Kim Kang-woo, Im Won-hee and Lee Ha-na. Produced by ShowEast and distributed by CJ Entertainment, it was released on November 1, 2007 with the length of 114 minutes.

Based on the popular manhwa Sikgaek by Huh Young-man, the film tells the story of two chefs competing for the title of heir to the last Royal Chef of the Joseon Dynasty.

Synopsis
At a press conference, the cooking knife of the last Royal Chef of Joseon Dynasty is presented to the public. The chef, who did not wish to cook for the Japanese imperial rulers, cut off his hand with this knife. The Japanese bureaucrat at the time was moved by the chef's loyalty to king and country, and kept it upon his return to Japan. Now, to redeem past evils, his son has decided to return it to Korea. In order to find a deserving owner he announces a nationwide culinary competition to find the best cook to own this knife, and become the true heir of the last Korean Royal Chef of Joseon Dynasty.

Archenemies Seong-chan (Kim Kang-woo) and Bong-ju (Im Won-hee) rekindle their longstanding rivalry as they sharpen their knives. Five years before, the two had competed to take over Unamjeong, a renowned Korean restaurant. But Seong-chan suffered a critical blow when his blowfish dish poisons the jurors. Distraught, he retires to the countryside, while Bong-ju exploits the wealth and fame of his inheritance. With the help of Jin-su (Lee Ha-na), a pretty, energetic reporter, Seong-chan makes a comeback. But now, he must not only battle the blindly ambitious Bong-ju, but also face the corrupt jurors and take care of his Alzheimer's-struck grandfather, and also take a few moments to contemplate the budding romance with Jin-su.

Cast
 Kim Kang-woo as Seong-chan
 Lee Tae-ri - young Seong-chan - (credit as Lee Min-ho)
 Lee Ha-na as Jin-su 
 Im Won-hee as Bong-ju 
 Jung Eun-pyo - Ho-seong, Seong-chan's sous-chef in the competition
 Kim Seong-won - finals commentator
 Jung Jin

Reception
It sold 3,038,868 tickets nationwide and was the 4th most attended film of 2007.

Spin-off
The manhwa was also adapted into the television series Gourmet starring Kim Rae-won, Nam Sang-mi and Kim So-yeon, that aired on SBS in 2008.

A sequel to the film, Le Grand Chef 2: Kimchi Battle was released in 2010, starring Kim Jung-eun and Jin Goo.

References

External links 
  
 
 

2007 films
2007 drama films
South Korean drama films
Cooking films
Films about chefs
Films based on manhwa
Films based on works by Huh Young-man
CJ Entertainment films
2000s Korean-language films
Live-action films based on comics
2000s South Korean films